Majibur Rahman Sarwar is a Bangladesh Nationalist Party (BNP) politician. He is the former mayor of Barisal City Corporation and former member of parliament for Barisal-5.

Career
Sarwar was elected to parliament from Barisal-5 as a Bangladesh Nationalist Party candidate in 1991, 1998, 2001, and 2008. He is the Joint Secretary General of Bangladesh Nationalist Party.

In 2018, Sarwar contested the Barisal City mayoral election but withdrew before the voting was completed alleging irregularities with the voting. He was nominated by the Bangladesh Nationalist Party to contest the 2018 General Election from Barisal-5.

References

Bangladesh Nationalist Party politicians
Living people
5th Jatiya Sangsad members
7th Jatiya Sangsad members
8th Jatiya Sangsad members
9th Jatiya Sangsad members
Year of birth missing (living people)